Maria College, Registration No.215287, was established in 1976. The College is headquartered in the Prince Edward campus in the Lee May Building in Mong Kok, Hong Kong.

History
Established in 1976, Maria College (Registration No. 215287) is a Hong Kong-based private secondary school specialized in university bachelor's degree and secondary school programs. It has been registered with the Education Bureau since 1977.

Locations
 Prince Edward, Kowloon
 Kowloon Tong (at Jockey Club Government Secondary School)
 Mong Kok (at Queen Elizabeth School)
 Causeway Bay (at )
 Yuen Long (at Yuen Long District Secondary School)
 Fanling (at )
 Tseung Kwan O (at )

Its head office was previously in Sham Shui Po. It previously had locations in North Point and Tai Po.

School Features
Maria College is a private school which provides HKDSE and GCE program. 
It also co-operates with Guangzhou Jinan University and provides three bachelor's degrees, which are: 
 BA of Business Administration (Registration No. 232240)
 BA of Sociology (Registration No. 232237)
 BA of Tourism management-Hotel Management orientation (Registration No. 232454)

References

External links
Maria College, Hong Kong 
Maria College 

Sham Shui Po
Schools in Hong Kong
Secondary schools in Hong Kong